"Last Thing on My Mind" is by English girl group Bananarama from their sixth studio album, Please Yourself (1993). It was released on 16 November 1992 as the album's second single. The track was produced by Mike Stock and Pete Waterman, two-thirds of the Stock Aitken Waterman (SAW) trio. Waterman stated in 2002 the song was influenced by Mozart. The single peaked at number 72 on the UK Singles Chart. In 1998, British group Steps released a cover version of the song as a single, peaking at number six on the UK Singles Chart.

Critical reception
Quentin Harrison from Albumism described the song as a "champagne pop-soul sparkler".

Music video
A music video was made to accompany the song, directed by Zowie Broach. It features the two girls dressed in suits, ties, and gloves as they meet in a high-class European cafe where they chat, giggle, and whisper into each other's ears. These scenes are intercut with scenes of each of the girls being caressed or hugging a male companion in an upscale bedroom. The video ends with the two girls leaving together in a limousine.

Track listings
UK CD single
"Last Thing on My Mind" (7" Mix) – 3:34
"Another Lover" – 3:31
"Venus" (Extended) – 7:25
"I Heard a Rumour" (Horoscope Mix) – 5:53

UK 7-inch single
"Last Thing on My Mind" – 3:35
"Another Lover" – 3:31

Credits and personnel

Vocals
Lead vocals – Sara Dallin, Keren Woodward
Background vocals – Cleveland Watkiss, Lance Ellington, Leroy Osborne*, Mae McKenna, Mark Williamson, Mike Stock, Miriam Stockley

Personnel
Production – Mike Stock, Pete Waterman
Mixing – Dave Ford
Engineer – Gordon Dennis, Peter Day
Assistant engineer – Chris McDonnell, Dean Murphy, Jason Barron, Jesse Tranbury, Les Sharma, Martin Neary, Paul Waterman
Additional engineer – Dillon Gallagher
Drums – A. Linn
Drums – Gary Miller
Keyboards – Gary Miller, Julian Gingell, Mike Stock
Credits adapted from the liner notes of Please Yourself.

Charts

Steps version

British group Steps recorded a version of "Last Thing on My Mind" for their debut studio album, Step One (1998).

Background and release
Following the release of their debut single "5,6,7,8", "Last Thing on My Mind" was released as their next single and became their first top 10 in the United Kingdom. The song became the group's first top 10 single in the United Kingdom charting at number six, outselling and outpeaking the original version. The song was produced by Pete Waterman and lasts for a duration of three minutes and five seconds. The two main verses are performed by Faye and Claire, respectively, whilst Lisa performs the bridge, after the instrumental. The chorus is performed by the entire group, and the song features no solo male voice.

Critical reception
Andy Coleman from Birmingham Evening Mail wrote, "The single sounds like a nineties ABBA and the video even contains "tongue in cheek" references to the 1970s Swedish pop icons." Also another editor, Phil Gould, noted it as a "ABBA soundalike". Can't Stop the Pop described it as an "out-and-out party song" with "elements of disco heartbreak in the lyrics", adding that it "absolutely radiates joy". Geir Rakvaag from Norwegian Dagsavisen felt it "could have been made by ABBA". Julie MacCaskill from Scottish Daily Record stated that it is "wonderful". Gary James from Entertainment Focus described it as "pure pop heaven", adding, "although when you stop dancing and start listening to the lyrics it’s actually about an unexpected break up; classic Stock and Waterman." 

Caroline Sullivan from The Guardian wrote that the track "aspires to ABBAesque melodrama". A reviewer from Music Week named it Single of the Week, adding, "This track - which gives more than a nod in the direction of Abba - is a welcome and surprisingly enjoyable diversion from the line-dancing pop sensation "5,6,7,8", which sold more than 300,000 units. It proves Steps are the Kings and Queens of boogie nights to come and, while it will find initially low support at radio, expect that trend to be reversed when they win even more fans over."

Commercial performance
"Last Thing on My Mind" debuted at number six on the UK Singles Chart on 26 April 1998, and after fluctuating inside the top 10 for three weeks, it re-peaked at number six in its fifth week. It spent a further week in the top 10, and collectively had a chart run of 14 consecutive weeks. Following their debut single "5,6,7,8" becoming their first top-40 entry, peaking at number 14 in November 1997, their subsequent 15 single releases all charted within the top 10, however "Last Thing on My Mind" was the only one to not make the top five prior to their split in 2001. "Last Thing on My Mind" is the fifth best selling song of Steps career, and it was certified gold by the British Phonographic Industry (BPI) on 21 January 2022 for sales and streams shipments of 400,000 units.

In continental Europe, the song debuted at number 41 in the Flanders region of Belgium on 9 May 1998. It jumped to number four the following week, and reached number one in its third week, a position it held for 10 consecutive weeks. In the Wallonia region, the song did not achieve the same success, peaking at number 16 in its second week, and remaining on the chart for five weeks. "Last Thing on My Mind" peaked at number 13 in the Netherlands, number 30 in France, and number 59 in Sweden. Elsewhere, the song peaked spent three non-consecutive weeks at number five in Australia, and peaked at number 24 in New Zealand.

Promotion
The music video for "Last Thing On My Mind" was directed by Phil Griffin. The video, which was filmed in Cuba, features Lee picking up all the band members in his convertible. When they sing the chorus, each member is singing a scene is similar to ABBA's Mamma Mia. The final scenes of the video are set around a pool where the band perform the full dance routine.

Track listings

European CD single
"Last Thing On My Mind" (Radio edit) – 3:04

French CD single
"Last Thing On My Mind" (Radio edit) – 3:04
"Last Thing on My Mind" (Instrumental) – 3:01

UK and European CD single
"Last Thing On My Mind" (Radio edit) – 3:04
"Last Thing On My Mind" (Wip't Up In The Disco Mix) – 5:39
"A Love to Last" – 3:42
"Last Thing on My Mind" (Instrumental) – 3:00

UK promotional 12-inch single
"Last Thing On My Mind" (Wip't Up In The Disco Mix) – 5:39
"Last Thing On My Mind" (Radio edit) – 3:04
"Last Thing On My Mind" (Wip't Up In The Disco Mix Instrumental) – 5:39

Australian CD maxi single
"Last Thing On My Mind" (Radio edit) – 3:04
"Last Thing On My Mind" (Wip't Up In The Disco Mix) – 5:39
"A Love to Last" – 3:42
"Last Thing on My Mind" (Instrumental) – 3:01
"5,6,7,8" (Radio edit) – 3:22

Credits and personnel

A-side: "Last Thing on My Mind"
Recording
Recorded at PWL Studios, Manchester in 1998
Mixed at PWL Studios, Manchester
Mastered at Transfermation Studios, London

Vocals
Lead vocals – Faye Tozer, Lisa Scott-Lee, Claire Richards
Background vocals – Lee Latchford-Evans, Ian "H" Watkins

Personnel
Songwriting – Mike Stock, Pete Waterman, Sara Dallin, Keren Woodward
Production – Karl Twigg, Mark Topham, Pete Waterman
Mixing – Paul Waterman
Engineer – Chris McDonnell
Assistant engineer – Al Unsworth, Bradlee Spreadborough
Drums – Chris McDonnell
Keyboards – Karl Twigg, Mark Topham
Credits adapted from the liner notes of Step One.

B-side: "A Love to Last"
Recording
Recorded at PWL Studios, Manchester in 1998
Mixed at PWL Studios, Manchester
Mastered at Transfermation Studios, London

Vocals
Lead vocals – Claire Richards, Ian "H" Watkins
Background vocals – Faye Tozer, Lisa Scott-Lee, Lee Latchford-Evans

Personnel
Songwriting – Barry Upton, Steve Crosby
Production – Dan Sanders, Pete Waterman
Mixing – Paul Waterman
Credits adapted from the liner notes of "Last Thing on My Mind".

Charts and certifications

Weekly charts

Year-end charts

Certifications

Notable cover versions
Sha-Na recorded a version of the song, peaking at number 38 on the Ultratop Flanders chart.

References

1992 singles
1992 songs
1998 singles
Bananarama songs
Jive Records singles
London Records singles
Songs written by Keren Woodward
Songs written by Mike Stock (musician)
Songs written by Pete Waterman
Songs written by Sara Dallin
Steps (group) songs
Ultratop 50 Singles (Flanders) number-one singles